The 2007 Qatar motorcycle Grand Prix was the opening round of the 2007 MotoGP championship. It took place on the weekend of 8–10 March 2007 at the 5.38 km Losail International Circuit in Qatar.

The MotoGP race was the first for the 800cc (48.8 cu in) engines and the Honda RC212V. These were brought in as replacements for the 990cc (60.4 cu in) engines and the Honda RC211V which were used since the beginning of the four-stroke era back in 2002.

MotoGP classification

250 cc classification

125 cc classification

Championship standings after the race (motoGP)

Below are the standings for the top five riders and constructors after round one has concluded.

Riders' Championship standings

Constructors' Championship standings

 Note: Only the top five positions are included for both sets of standings.

References

External links
 (Click on More details... for full classification)

Qatar motorcycle Grand Prix
Qatar
Motorcycle Grand Prix